Tell It to the Camera is an American television comedy series. It ran one season.

A variation on Candid Camera, the show had people expressing opinions directly to a camera.

Notes

Sources 
Terrace, Vincent. "Tell It to the Camera" in Encyclopedia of Television Shows, 1925 through 2007. Jefferson, North Carolina: McFarland & Co., 2008.

1960s American comedy television series
1962 American television series debuts
1962 American television series endings
English-language television shows
CBS original programming